In mathematics Euler operators may refer to:
 Euler–Lagrange differential operators d/dx: see Lagrangian system
 Cauchy–Euler operators e.g. x·d/dx
 quantum white noise conservation or QWN-Euler operator
 Euler operator (digital geometry), a local operation on a mesh which preserves topology